Chris MacFarland (born March 28, 1970) is an American ice hockey executive serving as the general manager for the Colorado Avalanche of the National Hockey League (NHL).

Early life
Born in the Bronx, New York, MacFarland played collegiate hockey at Pace University where he received a bachelor's degree in business in 1992 and later graduated from the university's law school in 1998. He began his career on the business side of ice hockey as an intern in the NHL's New York office from 1993 and worked in the NHL Productions office while attending law school.

Executive career

Columbus Blue Jackets
MacFarland joined Columbus prior to the 1999–2000 campaign and served as the manager of hockey operations from 2001 to 2007 before being promoted to assistant to the General Manager, Scott Howson, in July 2007.

MacFarland remained in the Blue Jackets organization for 16 years, serving in all facets of management and spending his final two seasons within the organization as the General Manager Blue Jackets' minor-league affiliate, the Springfield Falcons.

Colorado Avalanche
On May 21, 2015, MacFarland was hired by the Colorado Avalanche to serve in the same capacity of an assistant general manager to Joe Sakic. Working closely with Sakic, MacFarland played a pivotal part in helping the Avalanche rebuild from finishing last in the league in the 2016–17 season to capturing the Presidents' Trophy in 2020–21 and winning the Stanley Cup in the following 2021–22 season.

On July 11, 2022, MacFarland was promoted to the general manager for the championship-winning Colorado Avalanche, with Joe Sakic assuming the president of hockey operations role.

Personal life 
Chris and his wife, Chandra, have three sons, Jake, Gavin, Sawyer, and a daughter, Cara.

References

External links 
 

1970 births
American expatriate ice hockey people in Canada
American lawyers
American men's ice hockey forwards
Colorado Avalanche executives
Columbus Blue Jackets executives
Living people
National Hockey League executives
Pace University alumni
Stanley Cup champions